Dyakonovo is a rural locality and the administrative center of Dyakonovsky Selsoviet Rural Settlement, Oktyabrsky District, Kursk Oblast, Russia. Population:

Geography 
The village is located on the Vorobzha River (a left tributary of the Seym River), 68 km from the Russia–Ukraine border, 17 km south-west of Kursk, 2 km west of the district center – the urban-type settlement Pryamitsyno.

 Streets
There are the following streets in the locality: Gorodskaya, Komsomolskaya, Krasnoy Zvezdy, Lomakina, Lugovaya, Magistralnaya, Mirnaya, Molodyozhnaya, Parkovaya, Pervomayskaya, Pobedy, pereulok Pobedy, Polevaya, Sadovaya, Shkolnaya, Simonenko, Sovetskaya, Tsentralnaya, Zarechnaya and Zavodskaya (1542 houses).

 Climate
Dyakonovo has a warm-summer humid continental climate (Dfb in the Köppen climate classification).

Transport 

The rural locality is situated 29 km from Kursk Vostochny Airport, 117 km from Belgorod International Airport and 230 km from Voronezh Peter the Great Airport.

References

Notes

Sources

Rural localities in Oktyabrsky District, Kursk Oblast